Renault Korea Motors, is a South Korean car manufacturer headquartered in Busan where its single assembly site is also located, with additional facilities at Seoul (administration), Giheung (research and development) and Daegu (vehicle testing). 

The company was first established as Samsung Motors in 1994 by the chaebol Samsung, with technical assistance from Nissan. It started selling cars in 1998, just before South Korea was hit by the East Asian financial crisis. In 2000, it became a subsidiary of the French car manufacturer Renault, being renamed Renault Samsung Motors (RSM), although Samsung maintained a minority ownership. It adopted Renault Korea Motors as trade name in March 2022 and as its legal name in August.

Renault Korea Motors markets a range of cars, including electric models and crossovers.

History

Beginnings: Samsung Group era (1994–2000)

In the early 1990s, Samsung's Chairman Lee Kun-hee recognised the automotive industry as the culmination of several others. For the Samsung Group, this would allow to leverage resources and technologies from the entire group including Samsung Electrics and Samsung Electronics. He initially tried to take control of Kia, but competition from other bidders and legal restrictions led to him dropping the idea. Kia was eventually purchased by Hyundai.

Lee decided to create a new carmaker, Samsung Motors (also known as SMI) and a truck manufacturer, Samsung Commercial Vehicles Co., Ltd., the latter through Samsung Heavy Industries with Nissan Diesel's support. SMI was established in 1994 (incorporated in 1995) and Daegu-based Samsung Commercial Vehicles in 1996. Shortly after SMI started its operations, the Asian financial crisis hit. Samsung divested itself of SMI as well as other non-core subsidiaries. SMI was put up for sale, with Daewoo Motors being one of the first interested companies, but, as the crisis deepened, Daewoo Motors itself was bought by GM. Hyundai Motors was also considered as a possible buyer, but corporate politics and strife between the Samsung Group and the Hyundai Group made this impossible. Samsung Commercial Vehicles was kept by Samsung, but finally it filed for bankruptcy at the end of 2000.

Coupled with his interest on cars, Lee's project of building SMI as a global automotive company started out with technical assistance from Nissan, a company which at the time of SMI's early stages was in dire financial straits. SMI's affiliation with Nissan could have been one of the reasons for Renault buying a major share of the company, as Renault had become a major shareholder of Nissan by then. One of the very early planners for SMI has stated that technical affiliations for SMI were initially considered with Volkswagen, BMW or Honda. From 1998, Renault Samsung Motors sold cars in Chile with the introduction of the SQ5 (the current SM5).

Later developments: Renault era (2000–present)

Product and market expansion (2000–2010)
After the 2000 acquisition, Renault renamed Samsung Motors as Renault Samsung Motors (RSM). That year, the company's sales began to improve. Journalists attribute this to the success of the first car manufactured at Busan in taxi fleets (the SM5), which led to increased confidence of the model within the rest of their customer base. During the following years, the company introduced a new vehicle range, including the SM3 in 2002, the SM7 in 2004 and the crossover QM5 in 2007. Over time, RSM changed its products from a Nissan-based architecture to a Renault-based one. As part of the Renault group, Renault Samsung became an export-oriented manufacturer.

In 2005, Renault increased its stake by acquiring an additional 10% share from the company's creditors. On 26 June 2009, Renault and Samsung agreed to renew the right of the former to use the "Samsung" trade mark on its products until 2020.

Decline in sales, electric vehicles and recovery attempts (2010–2022)
The pressure from both Hyundai and Kia, dominant automakers in the South Korean market, increased during the 2010s, pushing RSM sales down by 27% in 2011. In the first half of 2012, they fell 41%. In August 2012, a personnel reduction of about 80% of employees was presented by management. Finally, Renault reduced its Busan personnel by 15% (about 800 employees). With the aim of reviving the company, it invested (together with Nissan)  to make Nissan Rogues for export to improve production output and also presented revised versions of the SM3 and SM5. During 2013, the company started to market a new compact crossover, the QM3, based on the Captur. By late 2015, its cumulative sales since 2000 in the South Korean market reached 1.5 million units. In 2016, Renault Samsung introduced the SM6, a new mid-size model which is a Talisman with some minor changes for the South Korean market, and the crossover QM6. In 2018, the company introduced the Clio and the Master. By 2019, production and sales were again declining, and the company announced an extension of its contract with Nissan for continuing the assembly of Nissan Rogues until March 2020, although in a reduced capacity to secure production volume. RSM also announced plans to gain more production orders from parent Renault. Tensions with labour increased, as the company started an early retirement plan aimed at reducing the workforce. During 2019, Renault Samsung discontinued most of its saloon models to focus on crossover SUVs. In June 2019, the company ended production of the SM5. At the end of the year, the internal combustion engined-SM3 and the SM7 were also put out of production, with sales ending by January 2020. In March 2020, the company put on sale the XM3 crossover.

In 2012, RSM introduced an electric version of its SM3 car known as the SM3 Z.E., imported from Turkey. In October 2013 the car started to be assembled at the Busan plant and in the same year it became the leading electric vehicle by sales in South Korea with a 58% market share. In 2016, RSM also announced its intention to market the Twizy which was launched in 2017. In 2020, the company started to sell the imported Zoe. In May 2016, the company announced a project to develop and produce a 1-tonne electric light commercial vehicle with a 250-kilometre range on a single charge in partnership with local companies.

, Chile was the only major market outside South Korea that RSM has sold its cars under the Renault Samsung Motors marque and not as rebadged Renaults. In 2015, Renault Samsung badging was replaced entirely by Renault in Chile, with the vehicles themselves now being known under their global Renault names (e.g. the Renault Samsung SM5 is the Renault Latitude). At the same time, the brand was discontinued in Kazakhstan.

In August 2020, RSM said it did not intend to renew the agreement to use the "Samsung" trade mark set to end that month, although it would keep using the Samsung name for a further two years as part of a "grace" clause. In March 2022, the company dropped the Samsung name, adopting the trade name Renault Korea Motors and starting the process of changing the legal name by August.

Geely involvement (2022–present)
In January 2022, RSM's parent Renault and Geely signed an agreement by which the South Korean manufacturer would produce vehicles based on the latter Compact Modular Architecture platform, initially intended for the domestic market. Production is set to start by 2024. In May 2022, Renault said a Geely subsidiary was set to acquire a 34.02% of Renault Korea Motors through capital increase as part of their partnership, although the company would continue to be majority owned by Renault and a consolidated subsidiary of it.

Facilities

Manufacturing
The car manufacturing plant is located at Busan in the Sinho Regional Industrial Site and began production in 1998. It covers 1,650,000 m2 and has the capacity to manufacture 300,000 cars per year. It can produce various models simultaneously in a single production line. The plant is divided into seven production shops (stamping, body, painting, bumper, assembly, al-casting and engine).

Research and development
The Renault Samsung Technical Centre located at Giheung near Seoul, is one of the largest research and development facilities of Renault after Guyancourt's Technocentre. It was established in 1997 as the Samsung Motors Technical Centre, being expanded in 2000 and adopting its current name. At first it was only involved in car engineering, but at the end of 2002 the RSM Design Centre was created within the facility to locally design various cars manufactured by the company. In early 2013 the design branch was renamed Renault Design Asia and was put in charge of supervising Renault's Asian design operations.

In November 2018, the company opened a vehicle testing centre in Daegu for vehicles aimed at the Asia-Pacific market, in partnership with the city government and Korea Intelligent Automobile Parts Promotion. The facility can test electric, autonomous and connected vehicles.

Administration
From 1995 until 2013, the company's head offices were at the HSBC Building in Jung-gu, Seoul. In January 2013, it moved them to a purposely-built facility, the RSM Tower in Gasan-dong, Seoul. In December 2017, RSM moved most management functions to Yeoksam-dong, Seoul, although kept some offices and car maintenance activities at the RSM Tower.

There are additional administrative offices in Busan.

Branding

Logos
Renault Samsung Motors initially had two logos: the corporate logo and the marque logo. The first was for corporate communications and  an adaptation of the Samsung Group's logo. The second is the "storm's eye" logo which was used as marque's badge and in advertising. The imported models introduced from 2017 onwards in South Korea kept Renault's diamond badge instead of being rebadged with the Renault Samsung logo. 

In March 2022, the company introduced a flatter, two-dimensional version of the storm's eye as both marque and corporate logo. The logo has lines similar to the 2021 Renault diamond logo.

Slogan
The advertising slogan of Renault Samsung Motors is Discover the Difference and was introduced in 2009. According to the company, it refers to the distinct quality of its products.

Vehicle nomenclature
The company includes in its vehicles' designations numbers related to their sizes.  Those numbers are 3, meaning compact or small vehicle, 5 and 6, mid-size vehicle, and 7, large vehicle. The designations also include the letters S and M, which stands for Samsung Motors and Samsung Motor Sedan. However, the sport utility vehicles replace the SM combination by QM (Quest Motoring). The imported models introduced from 2017 onwards in South Korea kept their original names instead of adopting RSM's nomenclature. In March 2020, the company introduced the XM nomenclature for a locally produced crossover SUV.

Typography
In 2016, Sandoll Communications, Inc. built a Hangul version of Renault's Renault Life font family for the company. It consists of three fonts in three weights (light, regular, bold) and one width in Roman only. The font was designed by Park Ju-seong and Wi Ye-jin, under the direction of Lee Do-kyung.

Solar energy project
In March 2013, Renault Samsung Motors completed the installation of solar panels in the parking lots, rooftops and surrounding land of its Busan facility to create a 20-MW solar plant, one of the largest in the world. The project was carried out through a joint venture, Busan Shinho Solar Power SPC, formed by RSM, Korea East-West Power and KC Cottrell, which also manages the plant. It provides energy to the RSM operations and nearby houses.

Shareholders
Renault Samsung Motors is majority owned by Renault with an 80.1% share. Samsung Card has a 19.9% share of the company.

Model lineup
 the model lineup consists of the following vehicles:

Renault Korea (formerly Renault Samsung) 
 SM6 (large four-door car based on the Renault Talisman)
 QM6 (the second crossover for the company, based on the second-generation Renault Koleos)
 XM3 (a crossover based on the Renault Arkana)

Renault (imports) 
 Master (imported light commercial vehicle)

Notes

References

External links

 Renault Korea Motors 

Samsung Motors
Former Samsung subsidiaries
Manufacturing companies based in Busan
Luxury motor vehicle manufacturers
Vehicle manufacturing companies established in 1995
Car manufacturers of South Korea
Battery electric vehicle manufacturers
South Korean subsidiaries of foreign companies